The Congress is a 1988 documentary film directed by the Emmy Award-winning director Ken Burns. The Florentine Films production, which focuses on the United States Congress, aired on PBS in March 20, 1989. Narrated by David McCullough, the documentary features use of photographs, paintings, and film from sessions of Congress, in its implementation of the Ken Burns Effect. Scenes from the Academy Award-winning Frank Capra film Mr. Smith Goes to Washington are also used. The work features numerous interviews from writers and historians including Charles McDowell, David McCullough, Cokie Roberts, George Tames, David Broder, James MacGregor Burns, Barbara Fields, and Alistair Cooke. Many congressmen are specifically referred to, including Henry Clay, John C. Calhoun, Jefferson Davis, Thomas Brackett Reed, Joseph Gurney Cannon, George William Norris, Jeannette Rankin, and Everett Dirksen. The film also includes focus on the Congress' work during pivotal periods in United States history, including the Civil War, Civil Rights Movement, and Women's suffrage. The documentary was released on DVD on September 28, 2004. Footage of the Capitol from the film was later incorporated into Burns' 1990 documentary The Civil War.

References

External links 
Official site

 

1988 films
American documentary television films
Documentary films about American politics
Documentary films about United States history
PBS original programming
Films directed by Ken Burns
1988 documentary films
1980s English-language films
1980s American films